Margaret Baxtresser (June 10, 1922 – June 7, 2005) was an American concert pianist. She was born and raised in Detroit, Michigan.

At age 13, she was a soloist with the Detroit Symphony Orchestra. At age 20, she won the Walter W. Naumburg Foundation International Piano Competition. Her concert career included soloing with many major symphony orchestras and took her to venues around the globe. In 1994, she became the first American artist to perform in Vietnam after the Vietnam War. The government of Vietnam invited her back on several occasions to perform. A staunch supporter of the arts in her local community of Akron, Ohio, as well as internationally, she was a professor emerita at Kent State University, where she taught piano for 25 years. She was married to Earl Baxtresser, with whom she raised two sons, two daughters, and two adopted daughters. Her eldest daughter is flutist Jeanne Baxtresser.

References

External links 
 Official website

1922 births
2005 deaths
Kent State University faculty
Musicians from Akron, Ohio
20th-century classical pianists
Classical musicians from Ohio
American women classical pianists
American classical pianists
20th-century American women pianists
20th-century American pianists
Musicians from Detroit
Classical musicians from Michigan
American women academics
21st-century American women